This is a summary of 1919 in music in the United Kingdom.

Events
April – Poet Robert Graves, temporarily living in Wales, asks composer John Rippiner Heath to set some of his work to music.
7 April –  The Original Dixieland Jazz Band arrives in the UK for a 15-month tour.
 August – Anglo-Welsh composer Philip Heseltine concludes a year's stay in Ireland with the writing of a number of songs which will be published under the pseudonym Peter Warlock.
22 July – Manuel de Falla's ballet El sombrero de tres picos (The Three-Cornered Hat) receives its world premiere in London, performed by Ballets Russes.
19 August – The Southern Syncopated Orchestra, while touring the UK, performs for King Edward VII of the United Kingdom. Ernest Ansermet's review is considered one of the first serious pieces of jazz criticism.
27 October – Edward Elgar's Cello Concerto receives its première in London, performed by Felix Salmond. The concert goes ahead with inadequate rehearsal time, because of Albert Coates, who is conducting the rest of the programme.
Elsie Griffin joins the D'Oyly Carte Opera Company.

Popular music
Fred W. Leigh & Charles Collins – "My Old Man (Said Follow the Van)"

Classical music: new works
Arnold Bax – Tintagel
Rebecca Clarke – Viola Sonata
Gustav Holst – Ode to Death
Charles Villiers Stanford – A Song of Agincourt
Ralph Vaughan Williams – Fantasia on a Theme by Thomas Tallis (revised version)

Opera
Rutland Boughton – The Moon Maiden 
Frederick Delius – Fennimore and Gerda

Musical theatre
22 October – Maggie, with music by Marcel Lattès and lyrics by Adrian Ross, starring Winifred Barnes, opens at the Oxford Theatre, London, where it will run for 108 performances.

Births
10 March – Margot Fonteyn, born Margaret Hookham, ballerina (died 1991)
13 August – George Shearing, jazz pianist and composer (died 2011)
15 August – Bernard Barrell, musician, music teacher and composer (died 2005)
4 September – Teddy Johnson, popular singer (died 2018)
2 October
John W. Duarte, writer, guitarist and composer (died 2004)
Sean 'ac Donncha, Irish traditional singer (died 1996)
11 November – Hamish Henderson, folk song collector (died 2002)
3 December – Charles Craig, operatic tenor (died 1997)

Deaths
20 March – Pauline Markham, vaudeville actress, singer and dancer, 71
2 June – Ernest Ford, conductor and composer, 61 
27 September – Adelina Patti, Italian-French opera singer resident in Wales, 76
date unknown – Oliveria Prescott, writer and composer, 75/76

See also
 1919 in the United Kingdom

References

British Music, 1919 in
Music
British music by year
1910s in British music